The Vlaamse Aardbeiencross is a cyclo-cross race held in Hoogstraten, Belgium since 1987. It became part of the Superprestige in the 1998–1999 season. In 2020 the race moved to Merksplas due to locations problems with the site in Hoogstraten, but the Februari race was annulled due to storm Ciara.

Past winners

Men

Women

Notes

References

External links
 

Cyclo-cross races
Cycle races in Belgium
Recurring sporting events established in 1987
1987 establishments in Belgium
Cyclo-cross Superprestige
Hoogstraten
Sport in Antwerp Province